Władysław Wróblewski (21 March 1875, Kraków – 19 August 1951, Łódź) was a Polish szlachcic, politician, scientist, diplomat and lawyer. He is notable as the last provisional prime minister of the German-controlled puppet state of Regency Kingdom before Poland regained their independence in 1918.

Biography
Władysław was the son of Wincenty Wróblewski and Waleria (née Bossowska) and brother of lawyer, Stanisław Wróblewski. He was from noble family of Lubicz coat of arms.

Wróblewski was a notable lawyer and docent of administration and administrative law at the Jagiellonian University in Kraków. On November 4, 1918, after the withdrawal of Józef Świeżyński's provisional government, Wróblewski was chosen by the Regency Council to act as the head of a new temporary provisional government. As the situation in Poland was changing rapidly, Wróblewski chose not to appoint his own ministers and instead continued the job of his predecessor, with the same set of ministers. The last meeting of his government took place on November 11 of that year, when all powers were ceded to Józef Piłsudski, who got back from prison in Magdeburg Fortress earlier that day.

On November 18 all ministries were taken by the new government of Jędrzej Moraczewski and the Regency Kingdom ceased to exist, giving way to the reborn Republic of Poland. Afterwards he remained an active member of the Polish administration, initially as an undersecretary of state at the Council of Ministers and later as a diplomat. Among other posts, he was the Polish ambassador in London and later in Washington. Between 1929 and 1936 he headed the Bank Polski, the state bank of Poland.

See also
House of Wróblewski (Lubicz)

References

External link

1875 births
1951 deaths
Politicians from Kraków
Lawyers from Kraków
People from the Kingdom of Galicia and Lodomeria
Wladyslaw
Prime Ministers of Poland
People of the Kingdom of Poland (1917–1918)
Ministers of Foreign Affairs of the Second Polish Republic
Ambassadors of Poland to the United Kingdom
Ambassadors of Poland to the United States
Academic staff of Jagiellonian University
Diplomats from Kraków